Danielle Henderson (born January 29, 1977) is an American, former collegiate All-American, medal-winning Olympian, retired professional All-Star softball pitcher who is currently the head coach at UMass. Henderson was a starting pitcher for the UMass Minutewomen softball from 1996 to 1999. Henderson also played professionally in National Pro Fastpitch from 2004 to 2007, where she currently ranks top-10 in career strikeout ratio (6.8). Along with numerous school records, she is the Atlantic 10 Conference career leader in ERA, shutouts, perfect games (3) and WHIP. Henderson represented the United States at the 2000 Summer Olympics and won a gold medal.

Early life and education
Born in Huntington, New York, Henderson grew up in nearby Commack and graduated from Commack High School in 1995.

College
In her freshman season of 1996, Henderson led the team in wins, ERA, shutouts and strikeouts. Henderson threw her first no-hitter in the NCAA play-in opener against Marist Red Foxes.

In 1997 as a sophomore, Henderson would earn her first National Fastpitch Coaches Association All-American and Atlantic 10 Pitcher of Year awards, as well as tossing two no-hitters and breaking the UMass season records for strikeouts, innings pitched and strikeout ratio. Her wins and shutouts were at the time both second best in school history. For the year, Henderson won her first pitching Triple Crown for the conference best in wins, strikeouts and ERA, while ranked in the NCAA top-10 for both ERA and strikeout ratio.

On April 26, 1997, Henderson struck out a then school and a career best 18 Fordham Rams in regulation, this was tied third all-time for an NCAA single game and now is tied fourth overall. The day prior on April 25, Henderson also began a 63 scoreless inning streak that endured until May 17 for a then career best. UMass qualified for the 1997 Women's College World Series. However, Henderson was selected to the All-Tournament Team.

Throwing five no-hitters (NCAA top-5 season tying record and one perfect game vs. the Fordham Rams on March 29, 1998) earned her all-season honors from conference and the NFCA in her junior season of 1998, moving from third to the second Team. Henderson broke four school records with her wins, strikeouts, shutouts (still the record) and a strikeout ratio of nearly 12; along with her ERA, she won a second conference Triple Crown. In addition, she again cracked the top-10 NCAA Division I season records with her strikeouts (led the NCAA), shutouts and then second best all-time season strikeout ratio mark, which also led the NCAA that year.

A return trip to the Women's College World Series ended by shutout as the Minutewomen lost their second game to Oklahoma State Cowgirls and would be Henderson's last appearance in the series.

In her senior season of 1999, Henderson posted six no-hitters (another top-five tying NCAA season record), two perfect games and repeated all-season honors, including a First Team All-American highlight and her third straight Atlantic 10 Pitcher of The Year and pitching Triple Crown. Henderson won 30 games, struck out a then school and conference record (total led the nation) and tied the best season ERA mark at UMass. She had a career best WHIP and her strikeout ratio of 13.9, set a new NCAA season mark that is now 6th all-time. Her 105 scoreless innings streak from March 16 − May 2, 1999 remains the NCAA record.

Henderson closed her career at UMass with the best strikeouts, ERA, shutouts, wins, WHIP, innings pitched, strikeout ratio, perfect games and no-hitter numbers, of which she still owns the ERA, WHIP, perfect games and shutout crowns. She holds the same career records for the Atlantic 10. Finally, in the NCAA Henderson is tied 6th in no-hitters (14) and 5th in perfect games (3) all-time for a career.

In May 1999, Henderson was awarded the Honda Sports Award as the best softball player in the country.

After her playing career, Henderson served as a private pitching instructor and was an assistant coach with Ohio State and Stanford. She rejoined her alma mater UMass as associate head coach for the 2014 season and has been head coach at UMass Lowell since 2015.

Professional softball career

2000 Olympics
Henderson began playing for Team USA the summer after she graduated in 1999. On July 29, 1999, Henderson threw a perfect game defeating Colombia 9–0 at the start of the Pan American Games.

She competed at the 2000 Summer Olympics in Sydney where she received a gold medal with the American team. Her only game was a 3–0 win over Cuba.

National Pro Fastpitch
Henderson began playing with the rejuvenated National Pro Fastpitch in 2004 with the now defunct Arizona Heat. She debuted on June 1, throwing two innings in a loss. Beginning on June 7-July 31, Henderson won a career best 7 consecutive decisions in 12 games, 5 complete. She struck out 55 batters and surrendered 35 hits, 30 walks and 9 earned runs for a 1.05 ERA and 1.08 WHIP. With the New England Riptide on June 5, 2005, she tallied a career best 13 strikeouts in a 3-0 shutout victory. She currently ranks top-10 in career strikeout ratio at 6.8. In 2005, Henderson made the All-NPF East Team.

Although she did not play, Henderson also won a NPF Cowles Cup Championship with the defunct New England Riptide on August 28, 2006.

Coaching career
Henderson had two stints as an assistant coach at UMass, first from 2000 to 2003 then as associate head coach in 2014. In between these stints, Henderson worked as a private pitching instructor before returning to college softball as assistant coach at Ohio State from 2011 to 2012 and Stanford under John Rittman in 2013.

On July 30, 2014, she was named head softball coach at the University of Massachusetts, Lowell.

Honors
In 2001, while serving a second term as Assistant Coach, the University of Massachusetts-Amherst ceremoniously retired Henderson's #44 jersey. In her last season with her the Minutewomen, Henderson was also inducted into the New England Women's Hall of Fame on September 24, 2002.

On October 9, 2009, Henderson was honored with an invitation into the UMass Hall of Fame.

Career Statistics

College

Professional

Head coaching record

See also
NCAA Division I softball career wins list
NCAA Division I softball career strikeouts list
NCAA Division I softball career -1.00 ERAs list

References

External links

1977 births
Living people
American softball coaches
UMass Minutewomen softball players
UMass Minutewomen softball coaches
Ohio State Buckeyes softball coaches
Stanford Cardinal softball coaches
Olympic softball players of the United States
Olympic gold medalists for the United States in softball
Softball players at the 2000 Summer Olympics
Medalists at the 2000 Summer Olympics
People from Commack, New York
Softball players from New York (state)
Isenberg School of Management alumni
University of Massachusetts Amherst alumni